Sprague River may refer to:

Sprague River (Maine), a stream in the U.S. state of Maine
Sprague River (Oregon), a stream in the U.S. state of Oregon
Sprague River, Oregon, a settlement named after the river